The Pasadena Volunteer Fire Department is a combination department (the fire chief is a career position) that provides fire protection for the city of Pasadena, Texas. The City of Pasadena itself was incorporated in 1928, and the Pasadena Fire Department was established shortly thereafter in 1930 with a base membership of 25 volunteer firefighters.

Along with the City of Pasadena, the department has multiple mutual aid agreements with neighboring cities as well as many other nearby municipal and industrial fire departments. Emergency medical services are provided by a private ambulance service under contract to the city. The PFD further provides mutual aid fire protection to Ellington Field, Johnson Space Center, and the University of Houston–Clear Lake. It is also an active member of the Channel Industrial Mutual Aid (CIMA) organization, which is a conglomeration of municipal and industrial fire departments that respond to the numerous petrochemical plants in the region.

Stations and apparatus 

The PFD has 9 stations spread across the city. Stations 2,3,4 and 8 have 2 Engine Companies. PFD has 9 Ford Explorer District Chief vehicles, 3 Cascades(Air/Rehab), 5 Safety Officer vehicles, and numerous other support staff vehicles.

References

Fire departments in Texas
Fire